Volovo may refer to:
Volovo, Bulgaria, an inhabited locality in Borovo Municipality of Ruse Province, Bulgaria
Volovo, Russia, name of several inhabited localities in Russia